Coleophora stramentella is a moth of the family Coleophoridae. It is found from the Czech Republic and Austria to Greece.

The larvae feed on Astragalus onobrychis.

References

stramentella
Moths of Europe
Moths described in 1849